AR-R17779 is a drug that acts as a potent and selective full agonist for the α7 subtype of neural nicotinic acetylcholine receptors. It has nootropic effects in animal studies, but its effects do not substitute for those of nicotine. It has also been studied as a potential novel treatment for arthritis.

References

Nicotinic agonists
Stimulants
Nootropics
2-Oxazolidinones
Spiro compounds